The 1921–22 Challenge Cup was the 22nd staging of rugby league's oldest knockout competition, the Challenge Cup.

First round

Second round

Quarterfinals

Semifinals

Final

The final saw Rochdale Hornets's 10-9 victory over Hull F.C. in the 1921–22 Challenge Cup final at Headingley, Leeds on Saturday 6 May 1922, in front of a crowd of 32,596. This was Rochdale's first Challenge Cup final win in their first, and as of 2017 their only, Challenge Cup Final appearance.

Rochdale Hornets: 10

Rochdale Hornets Tries: Tommy Fitton 2

Rochdale Hornets Goals: Dicky Paddon 2

Hull: 9

Hull Tries: Jimmy Kennedy, Billy Batten, Bob Taylor

Half-time: 6-7

Attendance: 34,827 (at Headingley, Leeds)

Rochdale Hornets: Frank Prescott, Tommy Fitton, Fred Wild, Teddy McLoughlin, Joe Corsi, J. Heaton, J. Keynon, Thomas Harris, Jack Bennett, Dickie Paddon, Tommy Woods, Dai Edwards, Louis Corsi

Hull: J. Holdsworth, Billy Stone (c), Jimmy Kennedy, Billy Batten, Emlyn Gwynne, Eddie Caswell, W. J. Charles, Jack Beasty, George Oliver, J. E. Wyburn, Edgar Morgan, Bob Taylor, H. Garratt

References

Challenge Cup
Challenge Cup